The Kasumi Kaikan (霞会館) is the association of the former kazoku of Japan.

It was originally called the Kazoku Kaikan (華族会館), or Peers' Club, and renamed in 1947 after the post-war Constitution of Japan abolished the hereditary peerage.  The association used to have its headquarters in the Rokumeikan building.

The association is a social club, similar to a gentlemen's club but women are also members. Membership is strictly limited to 950 families of the kazoku. Emperor Akihito and Empress Michiko as well as other members of the Japanese imperial family visit the club for special occasions.

The association owns the Kasumigaseki Building in Kasumigaseki, a 36-story skyscraper, and has its club rooms on the 34th floor.

References

External links 
 Views of the interior of the club rooms of the Kasumi Kaikan

Clubs and societies in Japan
Kazoku